Balay, founded by Esteban Bayona & José María Layrla, is a Spanish company, manufacturing home appliances, owned by the 
BSH Home Appliances Group. Headquarters were in Zaragoza, plants in Zaragoza, Pamplona, Estella, Vitoria and Santander. Balay Tubay, name of a 1930s house on Calle Real in El Nido in the Philippines, transformed into a tourist bar, with an exhibition of paintings and crafts.

References

External links 
 Balay website

Companies based in Aragon
Spanish brands
Manufacturing companies established in 1947
1947 establishments in Spain
Home appliance manufacturers of Spain
Zaragoza